Doon International School may refer to:
 Doon International School (Palia Kalan), Uttar Pradesh, India
 Doon International School (Basirhat), West Bengal, India 
 Doon International School (Dehradun), Uttarakhand, India
 Doon International School Riverside Campus, Dehradun, Uttarakhand.

Contributions (Doon International School, Dehradun) 
Gratitude to Old Teachers
When we stride or stroll across the frozen lake,
We place our feet where they have never been.
We walk upon the unwalked. But we are uneasy.
Who is down there but our old teachers?

Water that once could take no human weight-
We were students then-holds up our feet,
And goes on ahead of us for a mile.
Beneath us the teachers, and around us the stillness.
Thank you!

See also 
 The Doon School, Dehradun, Uttarakhand, India